Echinocereus fendleri is a species of cactus known by the common names pinkflower hedgehog cactus and Fendler's hedgehog cactus. It is named in honor of Augustus Fendler.

It grows in deserts and woodlands in the Southwestern United States and Northeastern Mexico. It is most common in New Mexico.

The taxonomy of the species is uncertain, with authors recognizing up to eight varieties.

Description
Echinocereus fendleri has an erect oval or cylindrical stem, sometimes forming a clump of several spreading stem branches. The stem may reach 7.5 to 30 centimeters in maximum height. There are up to 16 spines per areole, generally in shades of brown and white, or white with a brown stripe.

The showy flower is most any shade of pink, from nearly white to deep maroon. It can be 11 centimeters long and wide, each tepal measuring up to 7 centimeters long. The fruit is red and a few centimeters long.

The flesh of the plant is edible, and Native American groups consumed the stems and fruits.

Varieties
One variety of this species, Echinocereus fendleri var. kuenzleri, Kuenzler's hedgehog cactus''' (formerly Echinocereus kuenzleri''), is rare and federally listed as an endangered species of the United States. When it was listed in 1979, there were only 200 known individuals of this variety remaining, all in the Sacramento Mountains of New Mexico. It was threatened with extinction by poachers, who removed many plants from the wild.

More populations have since been discovered. The US Fish and Wildlife Service has suggested it be downlisted to threatened status. Kuenzler's hedgehog cactus differs from other varieties of the species by having large flowers, reaching 11 centimeters long and magenta in color, and white spines.

References

External links

USDA Plants Profile — Echinocereus fendleri
Southwest Colorado Wildflowers
Echinocereus fendleri Photo gallery

fendleri
Cacti of Mexico
Cacti of the United States
Flora of the Chihuahuan Desert
Flora of the Rio Grande valleys
Flora of Northeastern Mexico
Flora of New Mexico
Flora of Arizona
Flora of Colorado
Flora of Texas
North American desert flora